Badarka is a  village in the Unnao district of the state of Uttar Pradesh in India, and is situated on the Kanpur - Raibareli road. The village is the  place of freedom fighter Chandrasekhar Azad's father Pandit Sitaram Tiwari and mother Jagrani Devi.

About Badarka Harbansh 

According to Census 2011 information the location code or village code of Badarka Harbansh village is 142320. Badarka Harbansh village is located in Unnao Tehsil of Unnao district in Uttar Pradesh, India. It is situated 5 km away from Unnao, which is both district & sub-district headquarter of Badarka Harbansh village. As per 2009 stats, Badarka Harbansh village is also a gram panchayat.

The total geographical area of village is 68.08 hectares. Badarka Harbansh has a total population of 2,834 peoples. There are about 597 houses in Badarka Harbansh village. Unnao is nearest town to Badarka Harbansh which is approximately 15 km away.

Population of Badarka Harbansh 
The total population of Badarka is 2,834. The male population is 1,508, while the female population is 1,326

Transportation
Type	Status
Public Bus Service	Available within village
Private Bus Service	Available within village
Railway Station	Available within <5 km distance

Nearby villages of Badarka Harbansh 

Rajwa Khera
Lakha Pur
Ramchara Mau
Alhuapur Saresa
Katri Alhuapur Sares
Rawal
Supasi
Sathara
Garsar
Maviya Layak
Chheriha

About The Founder 
Badarka was founded  in 1643 AD by Raja Harbans, an official at the court of Shah Jahan, who received a grant of 500 Bighas from the Emperor in pargana Harha. He built a fine house here with walls of limestone blocks to a height of about 500m, surmounted with turreted walls, on an elaborate frieze of red stone over the gateway, having alternately Geese & Elephants in pairs. A large hall of audience supported on carved pillars formerly stood here, but Asaf-ud-daula is said to have taken these pillars to help building Imambara at Lucknow.

The house built by Raja Harbans was very picturesque and massive, and the strength of its construction was calculated to defy the hands of time.

Nearby 
Near Cities

Unnao  10 km near      
Jajmau  13 km near      
Kanpur  16 km near      
Purwa  34 km near      

Near By Taluks 

Sikandarpur Karan  9 km near      
Unnao  9 km near      
Kanpur  15 km near      
Bichhiya  16 km near      

Near By Air Ports 

Kanpur Airport  	10 km near      
Amausi Airport  	58 km near      
Bamrauli Airport  	191 km near      
Khajuraho Airport  	214 km near      

Near By Tourist Places 

Kanpur  	15 km near      
Bithur  	28 km near      
Lucknow  	68 km near      
Rae Bareli  	91 km near      
Kannauj  	96 km near      

Near By Districts 

Unnao  	8 km near      
Kanpur Nagar  	17 km near      
Kanpur Dehat  	59 km near      
Lucknow  	69 km near      

Near By RailWay Station 

Korari Rail Way Station  	7 ~ 8 km     
Magarwara Rail Way Station  	8 ~ 9 km     
Unnao Jn Rail Way Station  	11 ~ 12 km    
Kanpur Central Rail Way Station  14 - 16 km

References

(Unnao district personalities - includes Chandra Shekar Azad)
Shaheed of Varanasi lists Sri Chandrashekhar Ajad as being from Badarka.
india9.com: India - Uttar Pradesh - Badarqa Harbans

Villages in Unnao district